The 2017 Men's African Volleyball Championship was the 21st edition of the Men's African Volleyball Championship, a biennial international volleyball tournament organised by the African Volleyball Confederation (CAVB). The tournament was held in Cairo, Egypt from October 22 to October 29, 2017. Top three teams which had registered for the 2018 FIVB Volleyball Men's World Championship qualified for the 2018 World Championship.

Qualification

17 teams have registered to participate in the 2017 African Championship. But, Cape Verde, Congo and Zambia later withdrew.

Pools composition
The draw was held in Cairo, Egypt on 21 October 2017.

Squads

Venues
 Cairo Stadium Indoor Hall 2, Cairo, Egypt – Preliminary round and Final eight
 Cairo Stadium Indoor Hall 3, Cairo, Egypt – Preliminary round and 9th–14th places

Pool standing procedure
 Number of matches won
 Match points
 Sets ratio
 Points ratio
 Result of the last match between the tied teams

Match won 3–0 or 3–1: 3 match points for the winner, 0 match points for the loser
Match won 3–2: 2 match points for the winner, 1 match point for the loser.

Preliminary round
All times are Egypt Standard Time (UTC+02:00).

Pool A

|}

|}

Pool B

|}

|}

Pool C

|}

|}

Pool D

|}

|}

Final round
All times are Egypt Standard Time (UTC+02:00).

9th–14th places

9th–14th quarterfinals

|}

9th–12th semifinals

|}

13th place match

|}

11th place match

|}

9th place match

|}

Final eight

Quarterfinals

|}

5th–8th semifinals

|}

Semifinals

|}

7th place match

|}

5th place match

|}

3rd place match

|}

Final

|}

Final standing

{| class="wikitable" style="text-align:center"
|-
!width=40|Rank
!width=180|Team
|- bgcolor=#ccffcc
|
|style="text-align:left"|
|- bgcolor=#ccffcc
|
|style="text-align:left"|
|- bgcolor=#ccffcc
|
|style="text-align:left"|
|-
|4
|style="text-align:left"|
|-
|5
|style="text-align:left"|
|-
|6
|style="text-align:left"|
|-
|7
|style="text-align:left"|
|-
|8
|style="text-align:left"|
|-
|9
|style="text-align:left"|
|-
|10
|style="text-align:left"|
|-
|11
|style="text-align:left"|
|-
|12
|style="text-align:left"|
|-
|13
|style="text-align:left"|
|-
|14
|style="text-align:left"|
|}

Awards

Most Valuable Player
 Ismaïl Moalla
Best Spiker
 Yvan Kody
Best Blocker
 Amin Oumessad
Best Server
 Abdalla Ahmed

Best Setter
 Khaled Ben Slimene
Best Receiver
 Ahmed Shafik
Best Libero
 Anouer Taouerghi

See also
2017 Women's African Volleyball Championship

References

External links
Official website

2017 Men
African Men's Volleyball Championship
Men's African Volleyball Championship
2017 in Egyptian sport
International volleyball competitions hosted by Egypt
Sports competitions in Cairo
Men's African Volleyball Championship